Portland and Yarmouth Electric Railway was an electric trolleycar service that ran between Portland and Yarmouth, Maine, from 1898 and 1933. Described in 1901 as the "new electric road", Yarmouth was "now a closer neighbor [to Portland] than ever before" because of the railway's advent.

History 

Although the plan was chartered by a special act of the Maine Legislature on November 21, 1894, the railway company was not established until August 2, 1898. Its trolleycars ran every fifteen minutes for a one-hour journey from Portland, the state's largest city, to Yarmouth, a coastal town on Casco Bay's northern shores. After crossing a predecessor of today's Tukey's Bridge (the construction of which delayed the line's opening) and the second iteration of Martin's Point Bridge, its route north of Portland followed in parallel the Atlantic Highway (today's State Route 88) through Falmouth Foreside (stopping at Underwood Spring Park and its casino), then, at the former Westcustogo Inn, took a left onto Pleasant Street shortly after entering Yarmouth. It then descended  into Yarmouth Harbor, before turning sharply to climb around  Marina Road up to the village's Main Street.

At Yarmouth, passengers could alight and board a Portland and Brunswick Street Railway car to continue up the coast. In 1906, after an agreement between the two lines, a bridge was built over the Royal River in today's Royal River Park, connecting the Brunswick and Portland trolleys at the Grand Trunk depot in town. The tracks ran down what is today's walkers' path to the Rowe School. The pedestrian bridge in the park is built on old abutments for a trolley line which ran between Yarmouth and Freeport between 1906 and 1933.

The former express car No. 3, a "root" scraper, was used to clear snow from the tracks.

Closure 

The company liquidated in 1933, after the advent of the automobile made rail travel a less convenient option.

References 

Defunct Maine railroads
Transportation in Yarmouth, Maine
Transportation in Portland, Maine
1898 establishments in Maine
1933 disestablishments in Maine
Streetcars in the United States